Ulundurpet is a Taluk located in the eastern region of Kallakurichi district in the Indian state of Tamil Nadu. The town of Ulundurpet is the taluk headquarters.

Demographics
According to the 2011 census, the taluk of Ulundurpet had a population of 369,357 with 186,410  males and 182,947 females. There were 981 women for every 1000 men. The taluk had a literacy rate of 60.38. Child population in the age group below 6 was 23,270 Males and 21,734 Females.

See also
Parrikal

References 

Taluks of Kallakurichi district